is a cover album by the Irish pop group The Nolans. Released on 19 January 2005 exclusively in Japan by Sony Music Direct, the album is a re-recording of the group's 1991 cover album Playback Part 2 to commemorate the 25th retirement anniversary of Japanese idol Momoe Yamaguchi. It was released in two editions: CD only and a limited edition CD + DVD set.

Track listing

References

External links
 
 

2005 albums
The Nolans albums
Covers albums
Sony Music Entertainment Japan albums